Kampong Rou is a district located in Svay Rieng Province, Cambodia. The district is subdivided into 12 khums and 87 phums. According to the 1998 census of Cambodia, it had a population of 61,496.

References 

Districts of Svay Rieng province